Feist may refer to:

 Feist (dog), a small hunting dog
 Feist (video game), an action video game for PlayStation 4, Linux, OS X, Windows, and Xbox One
 Feist Publications, Inc., v. Rural Telephone Service Co. (also Feist), a decision by the Supreme Court of the United States

People 
 Feist (singer) (born 1976), Canadian indie pop singer-songwriter and guitarist
 Felix E. Feist (1910–1965), American film and television director and writer
 Gene Feist (1923–2014), American playwright, theater director and co-founder of the Roundabout Theater Company
 Gregory J. Feist (born 1961), American psychologist
 Leo Feist (1869–1930), publisher of popular American music
 Margot Honecker (1927–2016), East German politician
 Mathias Feist (born 1961), ChessBase and Fritz programmer
 Rainer Feist (1945–2007), officer in the German Navy
 Raymond E. Feist (born 1945), American fantasy fiction author
 Sigmund Feist (1865–1943), German Jewish pedagogue and historical linguist